The Spain women's national under-21 field hockey team represents Spain in women's international under-21 field hockey and is controlled by the Royal Spanish Hockey Federation, the governing body for field hockey in Spain.

The team competes in the EuroHockey Junior Championships where their best result was winning the gold medal in 2019. They have qualified for every Junior World Cup except the first one, their best result was the fourth-place finish in 2016.

Tournament record

Junior World Cup
 1993 – 7th place
 1997 – 9th place
 2001 – 10th place
 2005 – 6th place
 2009 – 13th place
 2013 – 5th place
 2016 – 4th place
 2022 – Withdrew
 2023 – Qualified

EuroHockey Junior Championship
 1977 – 6th place
 1978 – 
 1979 – 4th place
 1981 – 
 1984 – 4th place
 1988 – 5th place
 1992 – 
 1996 – 5th place
 1998 – 4th place
 2000 – 5th place
 2002 – 5th place
 2004 – 5th place
 2006 – 4th place
 2008 – 5th place
 2010 – 
 2012 – 
 2014 – 4th place
 2017 – 5th place
 2019 – 
 2022 – 5th place

Source:

See also
 Spain men's national under-21 field hockey team
 Spain women's national field hockey team

References

Under-21
Women's national under-21 field hockey teams
Field hockey